The Mirasi are a community found in North India and Pakistan. They are folklore tellers and traditional singers
and dancers of a number of communities. The word "mirasi" is derived from the Arabic word (ميراث) mīrās, which means inheritance or sometimes heritage. In the strict grammatical sense of the term, they are considered to be propagators of the cultural and social heritage.

History and origin

In North India 
Included within the name Mirasi are a number of sub-groups, each with their own history and origin myths. Some Mirasi groups are Muslim converts from the Hindu Dom caste, while others claim to have originally belonged to the Hindu Charan community. They are said to have converted to Islam at the hands of Amir Khusro, the 13th Century Sufi poet. The word mirasi is derived from the Arabic word miras, which means inheritance or sometimes heritage. They folklore singers and tellers of historical events within the community of North India also inform of societal events, and as such the keepers of the heritage or Mirasi. The North Indian Mirasi are divided into five main sub-groups, the Abbal, Posla, Bet, Kattu and Kalet. In customs, they are similar to the Muslim Raibhat, another community of mirasis who inform of historical societal events. Also related to the Mirasi are the Kingharia, another community that once employed as musicians and entertainers.

Some are also known as Pakhwaji due to the pakhwaj, a timbrel that they play.

In Delhi 

The Mirasi of Delhi claim descent from the Charanas. The Charanas are said to have converted to Islam during early Mughal rule and were also associated with Amir Khusrau. They are found in the localities of Seelampur, Shahdara, Bawana, and Narela. They affix the surnames Khan, Bobla, Posla, Izmir, Mir (Meer), Sabri, Ahmed and Mallick. The Charan Mirasi are singers and musicians, and were associated with the Mughal court in Delhi. Many Charan Mirasi khandans (families) attained great fame at the court of the emperors, while others were devotional singers (qawwals) at the various Sufi shrines, such as that of Niz'amuddin. Some are Saangi, such as the Raagni singers. Muslim communities in Delhi suffered at the time of independence, with many members emigrating to Pakistan.

Uttar Pradesh 

There is a concentration of the community in western Uttar Pradesh, found mainly in the districts of Meerut, Muzaffarnagar and Bulandshahr. Historically, the Mirasi were the genealogists of the Rebari community, whom they accompanied from Rajasthan. They have a traditional caste council, headed by headman known as a mukhiya. The caste council deals with infringement of community rules, settle disputes and prevent immoral activity. They are Sunni Muslims, but also worship Sikh Gurus and Hindu gods. The Mirasi speak standard Urdu, although most can speak the various dialects of Hindi. The Naqqal of Lucknow are an important sub-group of the Mirasi of Uttar Pradesh.

In Bihar 

In Bihar, the Mirasi claim to have come from Uttar Pradesh in the 16th century. Many were musicians at the court of the many zamindars of Bihar although these were courts of there ancestors. With the abolition of the zamindari system, the Mirasi have taken to farming that was something as return to nature. A few are still called to sing songs at special occasions, such as weddings and funerals. Many Mirasi are now Shia, and play an important role in the Moharam festivities. They are found mainly in the districts of Bhagalpur, Bhojpur, Gaya, Munger, Nalanda and Patna districts. The Mirasi speak Magadhi among themselves and Urdu with outsiders. Unlike other Mirasi communities, the Bihar Mirasi have never been genealogists. The Pamaria community are a major sub-division of the Mirasi of Bihar.

Rajasthan 

The Mirasi of Rajasthan are found in the districts of Bikaner, Jaipur Jodhpur, Nagaur, Chittorgarh, Ajmer, Hanumangarh, Sriganganagar, Churu, Sikar, Barmer, Bhilwara and Jaisalmer Jhunjhnu

In Haryana 

The Mirasi of Haryana are also known as Dom. They are found mainly in Mewat, Rohtak, Faridabad, Hissar, Karnal, Kurukshetra, Sonepat and Mahendergarh districts. The community speak Haryanvi, and many can also speak Urdu. They are mainly a landless community, and were traditionally employed as singers and entertainers, as well as serving as genealogists of the Jat community. Most have now abandoned their traditional occupation, and are employed as wage labourers. They are an extremely marginalised community. The community is endogamous, and practice clan exogamy, and consist of a number of clans, the main ones being the Bhat, Borda,Sanp,Nimbha, posla and Seol. Each of these is of equal status, and intermarry.

The Mirasi of Indian Punjab 
The Mirasi in Indian Punjab are Muslim, Hindu and Sikh.  The community is divided into three groups, the Balmiki, Dom and Muslim Mirasi. The Balmiki Mirasi consist of a number of gotras, and marriage is forbidden within the gotra. While the Muslim Mirasi marry among close kin. The Mirasis of Punjab are a Punjabi speaking community, although most speak and understand Urdu. They consist of a number sub-groups, the main ones being the Rai Mirasi, Mir Mirasi, Rababis, Kamachis, Dhadi, Kumachi, Kulawant and Mir Mang. The Dhadi and Rababi are Sikh, while the other groups are Hindu and Muslim. They have produced a number of folk singers, and unlike their counterparts in West Punjab, the majority of the community are still involved in their traditional occupation.

Major sub-groups 

The Rai Mirasi claim to have converted from the Rai Bhat caste. They claim to have been Brahmin, and continued to compose and recite kabits after their conversion. The community are strictly endogamous, and are Shia Muslims.

The Mir Mirasi are said to have gotten their name on account of the fact that they were the wealthy inhabitants of the city of Ludhiana. They had a lot of villages Their sub-division, the Dhadi are Sikh, and their heredity occupation was singing praises of Sikh heroes.

The Kumachi Mirasi are the Brahmin community. According to their traditions, the community were Brahmins who converted to Islam on the condition that they would remain the genealogists of the Brahmin.

The Rababi are Mirasis who play a musical instrument known as a rabab. They trace their descent from Bhai Mardana, a Mirasi who used to play the rabab as an accompaniment to Guru Nanak. The Rababi are Sikh.

The Posla are Muslim Mirasis and consist of four sub-divisions, the Ghorian, Kharia, Malhar and Gurbal or veghwa, and were the heredity genealogists of the Sayyidas Arabic poslas were themselves having noble chain . Related to the Posla are the veghwa. poslas were also victim of dancing queens who left them as beggar and they adopted petty jobs and almost lost there noble Arabic past.

The Naqqal Mirasis were a community of mimics, and were found mainly in Ludhiana. They were associated with the courts of the Mughal emperors, were they employed as entertainers. The community is strictly endogamous, and marry close kin.

Other sub-groups include the Kulawant, the genealogists of the Rajputs, Mir Mangs, who were a community of beggars, Naqarchi who played a musical instrument known as a naqqara, the Naqib and Mirzada.

The Mirasi of Pakistan  

In Pakistani Punjab, the Mirasi are now mainly a community who participate in aashura activities recites nohas (mersaya), also they are good entertainers having provided many of the country's singers theater artists. Most Mirasi are now bilingual, speaking both Urdu and Punjabi. They are found throughout Punjab, and most villages contain their settlements. Some 'mirasis' in Northern and Central Punjab now call themselves as 'Khans. The Mirasis are known for their wit and humour and singing skills.

References 

Dom in India
Dom in Pakistan
Social groups of Uttar Pradesh
Punjabi tribes
Muslim communities of India
Social groups of Haryana
Social groups of Punjab, India
Social groups of Punjab, Pakistan
Social groups of Delhi
Social groups of Rajasthan
Muslim communities of Uttar Pradesh
Muslim communities of Bihar
Social groups of Bihar
Muslim communities of Rajasthan
Hindu communities of Pakistan
Sikh communities